Cığalazade Yusuf Sinan Pasha (also known as Cağaloğlu Yusuf Sinan Pasha;  1545–1605), his epithet meaning "son of Cicala", was an Ottoman Italian statesman who held the office of Grand Vizier for forty days between 27 October to 5 December 1596, during the reign of Mehmed III. He was also a Kapudan Pasha (Grand Admiral of the Ottoman Navy) as well as a military general. He was one of the most capable statesmen of the Ottoman Classical Age, having contributed to the eastwards expansion of the empire at the expense of Persia and successfully defended Ottoman Hungary from Habsburg invasion. However, because of court intricacies, he resigned from the Vizierate after just over a month in office.

Early life
He was born as Scipione Cicala in Genoa or Messina around 1545, as a member of the aristocratic Genoese family of Cicala. His father, a Viscount (di Cicala), was, according to Stephan Gerlach, a corsair in the service of Spain, while his mother is said to have been a Turk from Castelnuovo (Herceg Novi today). The Visconte and his son, captured at the Battle of Djerba by the Ottoman navy in 1560 or 1561, were taken first to Tripoli in North Africa and then to Constantinople. The father was in due course ransomed from captivity and, after living for some time at Beyoğlu (Pera), returned to Messina, where he died in 1564. His son, Scipione, was not released, but was inducted into the Ottoman corps of young boys to be trained for imperial service.  He converted, as was required, to Islam and was trained in the Imperial palace, rising to the rank of silahtar.  He first married Saliha Hanimsultan in 1574 (they had a son, Sultanzade Mahmud Pasha, who married Hatice Sultan, daughter of Sultan Mehmed III, and a daughter. Saliha died in 1576) and later Safiye Hanimsultan in 1577 (they had two sons and a daughter), both daughters of Ayşe Hümaşah Sultan and great-granddaughters of Suleiman the Magnificent. He found himself assured of wealth, high office and protection at the Porte.

Political career
He became Agha of the Janissaries in 1575 and retained this office until 1578. During the next phase of his career he saw much active service in the long Ottoman–Persian war of 1578–1590. He was beylerbey  (governor-general) of Van in 1583, and assumed command, in the same year, of the great fortress of Erivan, being raised to the rank of vizier at the same time.  He also played a prominent role, once more as Beylerley of Van, in the campaign of 1585 against Tabriz. As Beylerbey of Bayazıt, an appointment which he received in 1586, he fought with success in western Persia during the last years of the war, bringing Nihavand and Hamadan under Ottoman control.

After the peace of 1590, he was made governor of Erzurum, and in 1591, became Kapudan Pasha or Grand Admiral of the Ottoman fleet. He held this office until 1595. During the third Grand Vizierate (1593–1595) of Koca Sinan Pasha he was promoted to Fourth Vizier. At that time, the Ottomans had been at war with Austria since 1593. Cağaloğlu Yusuf Sinan Pasha, by then appointed Third Vizier, accompanied Sultan Mehmed III on the Hungarian campaign of 1596. He tried in vain to relieve the fortress of Hatvan, which fell in September 1596. He was present at the successful Ottoman siege of Eger (Eğri) (September–October 1596) and at the Battle of Mezö-Keresztes in October 1596 and took part in the final assault that turned an imminent defeat into a notable triumph for the Ottomans. In reward for his services, he was made Grand Vizier, but the discontent arising from the measures which he used in an effort to restore discipline amongst the Ottoman forces, the troubles which followed his intervention in the affairs of the Crimean Tatars, and the existence at court of powerful influences eager to restore Damat İbrahim Pasha to the Grand Vizierate, brought about his deposition from this office after 40 days.

He was Beylerbey of Damascus from December 1597 to January 1598. In May 1599, he was made Kapudan Pasha for the second time. In 1604, he assumed command of the eastern front, where a new war between the Ottomans and the Persians had broken out in the preceding year. His campaign of 1605 was unsuccessful, the forces he led towards Tabriz suffering defeat near the shore of Lake Urmia. Cağaloğlu had to withdraw to the fortress of Van and thence in the direction of Diyarbekir. He died in the course of this retreat in December 1605. He was ancestor of İlhan İrem, who is a famous Turkish pop singer.

Legacy
The Cağaloğlu quarter in Istanbul, a household name in Turkey for having been the equivalent of London's Fleet Street as the city's press center, and where Yusuf Sinan Pasha had constructed a palace and a hamam (Turkish bath), is named after him and carries his name to this day. The bath, known as Cağaloğlu Hamam after the Pasha, was reconstructed in 1741.

The song "Sinàn Capudàn Pascià" by the Genoese singer-songwriter Fabrizio De André tells the story of Sinan Pasha. It is completely in Genoese dialect and is part of the album Crêuza de mä.

See also 
 List of Ottoman grand viziers
 List of Kapudan Pashas
 Cağaloğlu, Istanbul
 Cağaloğlu Hamam
 Palazzo Cicala

Notes

References
Encyclopedia of Islam

Kapudan Pashas
Converts to Islam
1540s births
1605 deaths
16th-century Grand Viziers of the Ottoman Empire
Ottoman people of the Ottoman–Persian Wars
Italian Muslims